Vianasia is a genus of beetles in the family Carabidae, containing the following species:

 Vianasia guttula (Solier, 1849)
 Vianasia nigrotestacea (Solier, 1849)
 Vianasia opacicollis (Chaudoir, 1876)
 Vianasia rugaticollis (Mateu, 1976)

References

Lebiinae